Lagunes District is one of fourteen administrative districts of Ivory Coast. The district is located in the southern part of the country. The capital of the district is Dabou.

Creation
Lagunes District was created in a 2011 administrative reorganisation of the subdivisions of Ivory Coast. The territory of the district was composed by merging the former regions of Agnéby and Lagunes and removing the territory of the Abidjan Autonomous District.

Administrative divisions
Lagunes District is currently subdivided into three regions and the following departments:
 Agnéby-Tiassa Region (region seat in Agboville)
 Agboville Department
 Sikensi Department
 Tiassalé Department
 Taabo Department
 Grands-Ponts Region (region seat also in Dabou)
 Dabou Department
 Grand-Lahou Department
 Jacqueville Department
 La Mé Region (region seat in Adzopé)
 Adzopé Department
 Akoupé Department
 Alépé Department
 Yakassé-Attobrou Department

Population
According to the 2021 census, Lagunes District has a population of 2,042,623.

References

 
Districts of Ivory Coast